Backwoods generally refers to a woodland or forest. It may also refer to:

Media
 "Backwoods" (song), a 2009 song by Justin Moore from the album Justin Moore
 "Backwoods", a song from the Red Hot Chili Peppers' 1987 album The Uplift Mofo Party Plan
 Backwoods (film), a 2008 film starring Haylie Duff
 The Backwoods, English title of the 2007 film Bosque de Sombras

Other uses
 Backwoods, a colloquial term for areas of rural poverty, particularly in the US
 Backwoods Smokes, a cigar brand

See also
 Backwood (horse), a thoroughbred racehorse; see List of Melbourne Cup winners
 Woodcraft, skills and experience in matters relating to living and thriving in the backwoods
 Woods (disambiguation)
 Woodlands (disambiguation)
 Backcountry